Hana Krejčová (born 15 March 1961) is a Czech rower. She competed in the women's quadruple sculls event at the 1988 Summer Olympics.

References

1961 births
Living people
Czech female rowers
Olympic rowers of Czechoslovakia
Rowers at the 1988 Summer Olympics
Rowers from Prague